Narsee Monjee College of Commerce and Economics (also known as NM College) is a premier college for commerce and economics affiliated to University of Mumbai. The college was established in 1964 by Shri Vile Parle Kelavani Mandal. It was awarded a re-accreditation 'A' grade and 3.42 GPA in the first cycle assessment conducted by the National Assessment and Accreditation Council. The college has been consistently ranked among the top colleges for commerce and economics education in India.

Courses offered
The institute offers courses of study in various commercial disciplines:
Higher Secondary Certificate – Commerce
Higher Secondary Certificate – Vocational
Bachelor of Management Studies
Bachelor of Commerce - Regular
Bachelor of Commerce - Honours 
Bachelor of Commerce (Financial Markets)
Bachelor of Commerce (Accounting  & Finance)
Bachelor Of Commerce (Economics and Analytics)
Bachelor Of Commerce (Economics)
Bachelor of Science (Information Technology)
Master of Commerce
Advanced Accounting
Banking and Finance
Doctorate of Philosophy
(fellowship approval pending)

The college follows the curriculum laid down by the University of Mumbai. The institute focuses on the overall development of the students. The college regularly organises industrial visits (IV) to help the students to get a practical insight into the functioning of an organisation. The college faculty and students have also undertaken and published multiple research project that is either self-funded or partly-funded by the university, non-profit organisations, third party research survey firm, etc.

The college has also applied for 'Autonomy' with the University Grants Commission. Under this scheme the college will formulate and enrol its syllabus on par with the curriculum of national commercial bodies like ICAI, Institute of Actuarial Sciences of India, ICSI and in line with the latest rules and provisions required by the government and corporate entities. As of 2022, all the Candidates will be required to attempt a Computer-based Common Entrance test at designated centers for a total of 120 questions (1 mark each) across three sections for the MITHIBAI- NM(CET) in a time duration of 100 minutes. The sections are as follows:  
Section 1: Quantitative and Numerical Ability (40 Marks) 
Section 2: Reasoning & General Intelligence (40 Marks)  
Section 3: Proficiency in the English Language (40 Marks)

Library
I. J. Patel library covers a total area of 7400 sq. ft. divided in two floors. The college has a library with a capacity of more than 300 students. The library is equipped with Wi-Fi connectivity, UGC Network Resource Center and OPAC (Online Public Access Catalogue). The library has an institutional membership of the British Council Library, Indian Commerce Association and Maharashtra Economic Development Council. The college keeps the library open Monday to Saturday from 7:00a.m. until 7:00p.m.

Student life

The college has more than 20 active societies and clubs including Debate and Literary Society, The Economics Association, Planning Forum, Women Development Cell, Enactus etc., for students to gain necessary exposure in their chosen area of extra-circulars.

Apart from clubs and societies, the college annually holds festivals like Umang, Rotofest and Insight. Umang, being the college's cultural festival is tagged as the 'Asia's Fastest Growing College Fest' and attracts more than 50000 youths from all over the country. Insight is the business, finance and economics festival and holds business conclaves, international summits, workshops, seminars, etc.

Notable alumni

 Nita Ambani, philanthropist 
 Priyanka Chaturvedi, politician and spokesperson, Shiv Sena
 Makarand Deshpande, film director
 Anita Dongre, fashion designer
 Paresh Ganatra, comedian/actor
 Anupama Gokhale, sportsperson
 Ashutosh Gowariker, film director
 Nirmal Jain, business tycoon
 Dilip Joshi, comedian/actor
 Twinkle Khanna, actor
 Aamir Khan, actor
 Amaal Mallik, musician 
 Yasin Merchant, sportsperson
 Arundathi Nag, theatre artist
 Paresh Rawal, actor/politician, Member of Parliament, Lok Sabha
 Vipul Amrutlal Shah, film director
 Anita Sood, sportsperson
 Deepak Tijori, director/actor
Adarsh Gourav, actor
 Divyank Turakhia, business tycoon

References

External links
 Narsee Monjee College of Commerce and Economics webpage

Universities and colleges in Mumbai
Affiliates of the University of Mumbai
Commerce colleges in India
Education in Mumbai
Colleges in India